Brazilton is an unincorporated community in Crawford County, Kansas, United States.  It located along highway K-3.

History
Brazilton was named in 1882 for Thomas Brazil, a farmer who resided there.

A post office was opened in Brazilton in 1882, and remained in operation until it was discontinued in 1966.

Brazilton was a station and shipping point on the Pittsburg & Chanute division of the Atchison, Topeka and Santa Fe Railway. The railroad tracks were removed in the 1990s.

References

Further reading

External links
 Crawford County maps: Current, Historic, KDOT

Unincorporated communities in Crawford County, Kansas
Unincorporated communities in Kansas